Sonaul is a village development committee in Mahottari District in the Janakpur Zone of south-eastern Nepal. At the time of the 1991 Nepal census it had a population of 2842 people living in 506 individual households.
           - Ajit Yadav

References

External links
UN map of the municipalities of Mahottari District

Populated places in Mahottari District